Cerro Corá is a hill in Paraguay, with an elevation of 318 meters (1,043 ft). It is located in the municipality of Pedro Juan Caballero, Amambay Department, in the Amambai Mountains.

In 1870 it was the site of the Battle of Cerro Corá.

References

Hills of Paraguay
Geography of Amambay Department